Children of the earth and similar phrases may refer to:

Torchwood: Children of Earth, the third installment of the British science fiction series Torchwood
 Torchwood: Children of Earth (soundtrack)
Children of This Earth, a 1930 novel
Earth's Children, a series of historical fiction novels by Jean M. Auel
Děti Země, also known as Children of the Earth (COE), a Czech non-governmental organization
Jerusalem cricket, a North American insect with a name in Spanish that translates as "child of the earth"